During the 1996–97 English football season, Wimbledon competed in the Premier League. The season marked 20 years since Wimbledon's election to the Football League and was their eleventh successive season of top division football. It was one of the most successful of the club's history as they finished eighth in the Premier League and reached the semi-finals of both domestic cups.

Season summary
The opening day of the season saw Wimbledon lose 3–0 at home to Manchester United in a game mostly remembered for David Beckham's late goal from inside his own half. The Dons also lost their next two games, but then went on a 19-match unbeaten run, including seven league wins in a row. A 1–0 over Blackburn Rovers in December left them 3rd in the table, one point behind leaders Arsenal. The team's form tailed off in the second half of the season and they missed out on the chance of European qualification, finishing 8th. 

Wimbledon also reached the semi-finals of both domestic cups. Their FA Cup run saw them knock out holders Manchester United but they lost 3–0 to the eventual winners Chelsea at Highbury. In the League Cup they were eliminated on away goals by Leicester City, who also went on to win the trophy. The sale of Øyvind Leonhardsen to Liverpool at the end of the season left manager Joe Kinnear with a big hole to fill in a squad which had, so far, achieved so much on a shoestring budget.

Final league table

Results summary

Results by round

Results
Wimbledon's score comes first

Legend

FA Premier League

FA Cup

League Cup

Players

First-team squad
Squad at end of season

Left club during season

Reserve squad
The following players did not appear for the first-team this season.

Transfers

In

Out

Transfers in:  £1,900,000
Transfers out:  £140,000
Total spending:  £1,760,000

References

Notes

Wimbledon F.C. seasons
Wimbledon